Shadreck Mukenge (born June 14, 1986) better known by his stage name Mumba Yachi, is a Congolese musician based in Zambia.

Career
Mumba Yachi's love for music developed at a very young age. He grew up listening to Kalindula and Rhumba music. P. K. Chishala and Franco Luambo are said to be one of the people that inspired him to become a musician.

In 2009, he began his singing career. Since then, he has been nominated and has won various awards. He has worked with many different Zambian artists such as Chef 187, Slapdee and many others.

Discography

Studio albums

Singles

Controversy and legal issues
In 2017, Mumba was arrested by Zambia's Immigration Department when they discovered that he was a Congolese who had illegally obtained Zambian citizenship. The Immigration Department's public relations spokes officer said that Mumba made up a false identity to obtain a Zambian; NRC and passport with the names "Shadreck Mumba".

Upon his detention and subsequent investigations, Mumba still claimed to be Zambian and denied being Congolese. After a few weeks of investigations, Mumba withdrew the statement in which he claimed to be Zambian and he personally admitted that he was indeed Congolese.

Filmography
On December 11, 2021, Mumba released "Tazara", a musical short film in which he played the role of Fundi, the protagonist. It was directed by Mutembo Ndeke and its executive producer was Jakob Hoff.

Awards and nominations

References 

1986 births
Living people